"Homer's Paternity Coot" is the tenth episode of the seventeenth season of the American animated television series The Simpsons. It first aired on the Fox network in the United States on January 8, 2006. Mail from forty years earlier is discovered, and a letter from Homer Simpson's mother's old boyfriend states that he is Homer's true father. Homer sets out to find his supposed new father, leaving Abe Simpson behind. It was written by Joel H. Cohen and directed by Mike B. Anderson. The episode guest stars William H. Macy and Joe Frazier as themselves, and Michael York as Homer's new father, Mason Fairbanks.

Plot
As Marge drives on a highway to go shopping, she finds a toll booth, but she and other Springfield residents drive through an adjacent forest trail to avoid paying. A week later, Mayor Quimby enforces tire spikes and blocks off the escape route, needing money to "de-python" the town fountain. When Marge comes up to the booth, she refuses to pay and backs up, blowing out many cars' tires, which are thrown in the tire fire. The heat and smoke from it melts ice on Mount Springfield and reveals a mailman frozen for 40 years. His letters contain many revelations and one is delivered to Homer's mother, Mona Simpson. It is from her old lifeguard boyfriend, whose name begins with an M, who writes that if Mona replies to the letter, she has chosen him, and if she does not, she is choosing to stick with her husband, Abe, and that either way, he knows the baby she is carrying is his.

Wondering who his biological father really is, Homer goes to the library to look in "Lifeguards of Springfield in the Twentieth Century." The only person in there whose name begins with M is Mason Fairbanks. Homer goes to his house posing as a reporter, but eventually tells him he thinks he is his father, and Mason is delighted. He takes the Simpson family on a ride on his ship and tells them the story of the lost emerald treasure of Piso Mojado, which impresses them. However, when they come home, Grampa angrily accuses Mason of having tried to steal his wife and now trying to steal his family, and is saddened Homer would even think that Mason could be his real father. They have a DNA test, and after a suspenseful wait, Homer is thrilled to learn his real father is Mason Fairbanks.

While Marge, Bart, Lisa and Maggie have an awkward, uneventful visit with Grampa, Mason and Homer are underwater in individual submarines looking for the lost treasure. Homer gets separated from Mason, and he follows a small light, thinking it is him. It is actually a glowing fish, and Homer gets stuck in some coral. As his oxygen begins to run out and he starts to lose consciousness, he sees poignant flashbacks of himself and Abe. After three days in a coma, Homer wakes up in a hospital, tells Abe of his memories, and says he considers Abe his real father. Abe then reveals he switched the labels on the DNA samples after seeing how happy Homer was with Mason and the fully confirmed biological father-son duo share a hug.

Reception

Ryan J. Budke of TV Squad gives the episode a strong positive rating, quoting its ingenuity and charm. He calls it a funny episode with a lot of heart, and quotes that it was a great episode by comparing it alongside his other favorite, "The Girl Who Slept Too Little".

References

External links

"Homer's Paternity Coot" at The Simpsons.com

2006 American television episodes
The Simpsons (season 17) episodes